Ramdasha Bikceem is an American writer, singer, and musician. She published the pioneering riot grrrl zine GUNK in the early 1990s, which explored intersections of race and gender in punk and skateboarding.

History
Bikceem was raised in New Jersey in the 1970s, by parents into music and art. She was influenced by Joan Jett, X-Ray Spex, Grace Jones, Lunachicks, Run DMC, and Queen Latifah. She found out about riot grrrl zines, such as Bikini Kill and Girl Germs, after a friend became Tobi Vail's roommate in Olympia, Washington. In 1990, at the age of 15, Bikceem started her own zine GUNK focused on punk, skateboarding, feminism, and racism. She published five issues, which contained multiple essays attempting to articulate the double burden of being a black person and a girl. In GUNK #4 Bikceem wrote about the politics of being a Black grrrl: "I'll go out somewhere with my friends who all look equally as weird as me, but say we get hassled by the cops for skating or something. That cop is going to remember my face a lot clearer than say one of my white girlfriends." She also wrote about the lack of diversity within riot grrrl. Excerpts from GUNK were reprinted in The Riot Grrrl Collection anthology, compiled by Lisa Darms from the Riot Grrrl Archives at Fales Library at NYU.

Bikceem started playing guitar when she was around 14 or 15. She sang and played guitar in a band under the name Gunk that performed at the first Riot Grrrrl Convention in 1992 in Washington, D.C.

Bikceem moved to Brooklyn, New York in 1993. She attended Pratt University. In the early 2000s, she recorded vocals with Le Tigre, including songs released on their album From the Desk of Mr. Lady. Bikceem released the electronic dance-punk song "Good News" under the name Designer Imposter in 2007. In 2020, Bikceem created a soundtrack for New York-based artist Jonathan Berger's re-imagining of the Aspen Art Museum's gift shop.

References

External links
Gunk at ZineWiki
The Ramdasha Bikceem Riot Grrrl Collection at Fales Library, NYU
Gunk playing live at the 1992 Riot Grrrl Convention
Don’t Need You: The Herstory of Riot Grrrl 2005 documentary featuring Ramdasha Bikceem

Living people
21st-century American women singers
African-American musicians
African-American women writers
American multi-instrumentalists
American women in electronic music
Dance-punk musical groups
Fanzines
Feminism and history
Feminism in the United States
Riot grrrl
Skateboarding
Zines
Year of birth missing (living people)
Musicians from New Jersey
Women punk rock singers